Farthest North describes the most northerly latitude reached by explorers, before the first successful expedition to the North Pole rendered the expression obsolete. The Arctic polar regions are much more accessible than those of the Antarctic, as continental land masses extend to high latitudes and sea voyages to the regions are relatively short.

Early voyages 
War and trade had led to voyages between western Norway and Northern Russia around Knivskjellodden and the North Cape since at least the 15th Century. In 1607, Henry Hudson probably reached Hakluyt's Headland (a little south of the latitude reached by Barentz), but could not proceed further as ice lay packed along Spitsbergen's north coast. In 1612, an explorer from Hull, Thomas Marmaduke, claimed to have reached 82°N, while Dutch explorers in 1614 and 1624 claimed to have sailed even further north to 83°N.

In 1707, the Dutch whaler Cornelis Giles rounded the northernmost point of Nordaustlandet in Svalbard, passing 81°N. In 1806, the Resolution of Whitby, under William Scoresby, Sr, was said to have sailed north of the Seven Islands and reached .

Nineteenth century 
One of the first expeditions with the explicit purpose of reaching the North Pole was that of Sir William Edward Parry in 1827, who reached , a record that stood for decades. Adolphus Greely's Lady Franklin Bay Expedition bested Markham by a few miles, reaching  in 1882.

In 1895, Norwegians Fridtjof Nansen and Fredrik Hjalmar Johansen reached latitude .

Cook and Peary 
Two American explorers claimed to reach the North Pole; Frederick Cook in 1908 and Robert Peary in 1909. Cook's claim was soon judged to be fraudulent, and Peary was credited as the discoverer of the North Pole for much of the 20th century. With Peary's claim accepted at the time, overland expeditions to the North Pole came to an end.

Roald Amundsen of Norway redirected his planned Arctic expedition and instead aimed for the South Pole, which he achieved in 1911.

Wilkins–Ellsworth expedition 
In 1931, an expedition led by Sir Hubert Wilkins and Lincoln Ellsworth and partly financed by William Randolph Hearst attempted to reach the North Pole with a leased US Navy submarine named Nautilus. The Nautilus was modified for under ice operations by submarine designer Simon Lake so it could detect openings (or, if necessary, drill them) in the ice pack and surface to recharge her batteries. While the expedition was a failure, the Nautilus did reach a latitude of 82 degrees north. In accordance with the lease agreement, the Nautilus was scuttled after the expedition to prevent her reuse as a warship.

Conquest 
 
On 9 May 1926, Richard Evelyn Byrd attempted to fly over the North Pole in an airplane. He was widely credited with achieving this, but his claim subsequently became subject to doubt.

The first person definitely to set foot on the Pole was the Russian Alexander Kuznetsov, who landed an aircraft there in 1948.

On , a US Navy submarine, also named , was the first to sail under the ice pack to reach the North Pole. On , the  became the first submarine to surface at the North Pole.

Ralph Plaisted and his three companions, Walt Pederson, Gerry Pitzl and Jean-Luc Bombardier, are regarded by most polar authorities to be the first to succeed in a surface traverse by snowmobile across the ice to the North Pole on 20 April 1968, making the first confirmed surface conquest of the Pole before being airlifted out. 

On 6 April 1969, British explorer Sir Wally Herbert became the first person to indubitably reach the Pole on foot, having sledged from Alaska. His expedition was supported by air drops.

See also 
 Arctic exploration
 Farthest South

References

Sources

External links
The Race for the Pole Manuscript at Dartmouth College Library

Exploration of the Arctic
Geography of the Arctic
Record progressions